Robert Herrick may refer to:

 Robert Herrick (novelist) (1868–1938), American novelist
 Robert Herrick (poet) (1591–1674), English poet